This is a list of notable Cuban architects.

Architects

 Nicolas Arroyo
 Max Borges del Junco
 Max Borges Jr. (Max Borges Recio)
 Felicia Chateloin
 Leonardo Morales y Pedroso
 Jesús Permuy
 Matilde Ponce Copado
 Ricardo Porro
 Mario Romañach
 Raul de Armas

See also

 List of architects
 List of Cubans

References
 María Elena Martín and Eduardo Luis Rodríguez: Havana, Cuba: An Architectural Guide (Junta de Andalucía, Sevilla, 1998)
 Eduardo Luis Rodríguez: The Havana Guide, Modern Architecture, 1925-1965 (Princeton Architectural Press, New York, 2000)

 
Cuban
Architects